BASF Plant Science is a subsidiary of BASF in which all plant biotechnology activities are consolidated. The company was founded in 1998 and employs approximately 700 people at 6 different locations worldwide. The headquarters of BASF Plant Science is located in Research Triangle Park (North Carolina, USA) and has research sites in the US, Canada, and Europe. The company mainly develops genetically modified seeds at these locations.

Company profile

The company genetically modifies crops like maize, soy, cotton, canola, sugarcane, sugar beet, and potatoes for "more efficient agriculture". Together with subsidiaries and partners, as well as in cooperation with universities and research institutions, BASF Plant Science is developing new procedures and practices in genetic technology.

Genetically modified crops by BASF are sold and distributed through biotechnology companies like Monsanto, KWS Saat, Embrapa, or CTC (Centro de Tecnologia Canavieira).

Products

As of 2011, BASF Plant Science has developed three products:

 Amflora, a potato developed initially for the European market, producing pure amylopectin starch for industrial use. Waxy potato starch is used in industrial procedures to make yarn stronger and paper glossier; it also makes spray concrete adhere better to walls. Due to lack of acceptance of GM crops in Europe, in 2012 BASF Plant Science decided to stop its commercialization and research activities on the European potato varieties Amflora and Fortuna. Further it announced the relocation of the corporate headquarters from Germany to the USA.
 Cultivance is an herbicide resistant soybean. It received market permission from Brazil in 2010. Marketing and sales of Cultivance are through Embrapa, a Brazilian company.
 NutriDense is a higher nutritional maize plant used as a feed source for pigs, chickens, and cows.

A range of more crops are in the pipeline: 
 Maize, soy, canola, and cotton: The aim is higher biomass, and plants that better resist environmental factors such as drought or disease. These crops are developed on the island of Kauai in Hawaii and are distributed in cooperation with Monsanto.
 Sugarcane, sugar beet: The aim is to develop plants that produce more sugar for use in food or as raw material for biofuel production.
 Fortuna Potato: developed for resistance against Phytophthora infestans, a disease which is difficult to combat for European agriculturists.

Other products are being developed for the food industry for use in genetically modified foods. Examples include plants with a higher content of omega-3 fatty acids for preventing cardiovascular diseases, and plants with a higher content of astaxanthin which is used in fish farming as feed additive, and as a food supplement for humans.

References

External links
 BASF plant biotechnology

BASF
Genetically modified organisms in agriculture
Biotechnology companies of Germany
Biotechnology companies of the United States
Biotechnology companies established in 1998
1998 establishments in North Carolina